

Station list

Ab-Ai

Aj-Am

An-Ar

As

At-Az

A